Owen LLoyd (1664–1738) was an Irish Anglican priest.

Lloyd was born in County Louth and educated at Trinity College, Dublin. He received the degree of Doctor of Divinity (DD). He became a Fellow of Trinity College in 1685 and Regius Professor of Divinity there in 1699. Lloyd was Dean of Connor from 1709 until his death.

References

Alumni of Trinity College Dublin
fellows of Trinity College Dublin
Academics of Trinity College Dublin
Regius Professors of Divinity (University of Dublin)
Deans of Connor
18th-century Irish Anglican priests
People from County Louth
1738 deaths 
1664 births